Xanthorhoe anaspila is a species of moth of the family Geometridae first described by Edward Meyrick in 1891.

References

Xanthorhoe